6 is the sixth studio album by pioneering jazz group Soil & "Pimp" Sessions, from Japan. It was released on September 16, 2009.

Track listing

Credits
Performed and arranged by Soil & "Pimp" Sessions
Toasting [Agitator] – Shacho
Saxophone – Motoharu
Trumpet – Tabu Zombie
Piano – Josei
Bass – Akita Goldman
Drums – Midorin
Mastered by Yasuji Maeda
Recorded and mixed by Shinjiro Ikeda (tracks 1, 2, 3, 5, 6, 7, 8, 9, 10, 11, 12 & 13), Kiyoshi Kusaka (Dogugumi) (track 4 & 12)
Executive Producer – Akira Sekiguchi (Victor), Katsunori Ueda (Victor)
Assistant Engineers – Yoshiyuki Watanabe, Takamitsu Kuwano, Takahiro Okubo (Victor Studio), Keysuke Fujimaki, Yuji Nakamura (Heart beat), Takahito Yamamoto (Avaco Creative Studio), Masahito Komori (Bunkamura Studio)
A&R, Director – Yuichi Sorita (Victor)
Artist Promotion – Ryuichi Ishimaru, Toyonobu Hatayama (Victor)
Sales Promotion – Wataru Oka (Victor)
Artwork by [Art Direction] – Joe Satake (Schnabel Effects)
Photography - Masayuki Shioda

References

2009 albums
Soil & "Pimp" Sessions albums